The 1928 All-Big Ten Conference football team consists of American football players selected to the All-Big Ten Conference teams chosen by various selectors for the 1928 Big Ten Conference football season.

All Big-Ten selections

Ends
 Wes Fesler, Ohio State (AP-1; UP-1; WE-1)
 Ken Haycraft, Minnesota (AP-1; UP-1; WE-1)
 Robert E. Tanner, Minnesota (AP-2; WE-2)
 Jack Hutton, Purdue (AP-2; WE-2)

Tackles
 Otto Pommerening, Michigan (AP-1; UP-1; WE-1 [guard])
 Butch Nowack, Illinois (AP-1; UP-1; WE-1)
 Vincent Schleusner, Iowa (AP-2; WE-2)
 Leo Raskowski, Ohio State (AP-2; WE-2)

Guards
 Rube Wagner, Wisconsin (AP-1; UP-1; WE-1 [tackle])
 George Gibson, Minnesota (AP-1; UP-1; WE-1)
 Peter Westra, Iowa (AP-2)
 Joe Kresky, Wisconsin (AP-2)
 Russell J. Crane, Illinois (WE-2)
 John Parks, Wisconsin (WE-2)

Centers
 Clare Randolph, Indiana (AP-1; UP-1; WE-2)
 Richard Brown, Iowa (AP-2; WE-1)

Quarterbacks
 Frederick L. Hovde, Minnesota (AP-1; UP-1; WE-1)
 Frank Cuisinier, Wisconsin (AP-2; WE-2)

Halfbacks
 Chuck Bennett, Indiana (AP-1; UP-1; WE-1)
 Willis Glassgow, Iowa (AP-1; UP-1; WE-2)
 Ralph Welch, Purdue (AP-2; WE-1)
 Bill Lusby, Wisconsin (AP-2)
 Hank Bruder, Northwestern (WE-2)

Fullbacks
 Walt Holmer, Northwestern (AP-1; UP-1; WE-1)
 Mayes McLain, Iowa (AP-2; WE-2)

Key

AP = Associated Press

UP = United Press

WE = Walter EckersallBold''' = Consensus first-team selections of at least two of the listed selectors (AP, UP and Eckersall)

See also
1928 College Football All-America Team

References

All-Big Ten Conference
All-Big Ten Conference football teams